The Volvo L340 was a light truck produced by Swedish automaker Volvo between 1950 and 1956.

History
The L340, introduced in 1950, was an update of the predecessor L201/202. The mechanical components were the same, but the truck got a more modern front end, mimicking the contemporary taxicab PV831/832.

References

External links 

 Volvo Trucks Global - history
 Swedish brass cars - picture gallery

L340
Vehicles introduced in 1950